Alfonso Herrera Rodríguez (born 28 August 1983) is a Mexican actor and singer.

Born in Mexico City, Herrera made his television debut in Clase 406 in 2002. In the same year, his made film debut in Amar te duele and won a MTV Movie Awards Mexico. In 2004, he achieved international stardom playing the protagonist Miguel Arango in the Mexican telenovela Rebelde, which spanned the pop musical group RBD (2004–09). Herrera was one of the six lead singers in the group, which was successful in Latin America, USA and Europe, was nominated twice to the Latin Grammy Award and sold more than 10 million albums worldwide. In 2009, he starred in the Venezuelan film Venezzia, the Mexican series Mujeres Asesinas and the Mexican telenovela Camaleones.

In 2014, Herrera played the lead role in the political satire comedy film The Perfect Dictatorship. From 2015 to 2018, he sensitively portrayed art lecturer, Hernando Fuentes, secret boyfriend of actor Lito Rodriguez, in the American drama series Sense8 on Netflix. He played Father Tomas on the American horror series The Exorcist (2016–17). He co-starred in the American drama series Queen of the South (2018–19). Herrera portrayed Ignacio de la Torre y Mier in Dance of the 41 (2020) and received acclaim for his performance, winning the Ariel Award for Best Actor. In 2022, he co-starred as cartel lieutenant Javi Elizondro in the final season of the Netflix crime drama series Ozark.

Early life 
Alfonso Herrera Rodríguez was born in Mexico City. He has an older brother, Alejandro and a younger brother, Oscar. He attended the Edron Academy, alongside Gael García Bernal and Ximena Sariñana and graduated in 2002. Herrera originally wanted to become a pilot and was going to move to San Antonio, Texas, to enroll in an aviation school. He changed his mind and decided to enroll at the Centro de Educación Artística run by Latin American media giant Televisa.

Career

Following his completion at the Centro de Educación Artística, Herrera began working professionally in theater. He performed in Las Brujas de Salem (2001), Como matar a un ruiseñor (2001) and Antigona (2001).

In 2002, he was cast in the film Amar te duele, directed by Fernando Sariñana, and from there moved into television, working in the telenovela Clase 406, alongside Dulce María, Anahí, and Christian Chávez, who later became his bandmates in RBD. When he starred in the soap opera Clase 406, Herrera participated in the soundtrack together with the cast in the songs "De Donde Vienes... A Donde Vas...?", "Corazón de Ángel", "Por Ti", "Shala La La" and "Grito" from the album Clase 406 - El Siguiente Paso ...! (2003).

In 2004, he participated in the episode "Tres Lágrimas" of the Mexican series Mujer, Casos de la Vida Real and he was cast as one of the main characters in Rebelde, a Mexican remake of the hit Argentine novela Rebelde Way. Herrera played Miguel Arango, a teenager who moves to Mexico City to avenge his father's death. Rebelde was a hit worldwide and had over 400 episodes, lasting from 2004 to 2006.

Following the success of Rebelde, in 2007, Televisa released RBD: La Familia, which starred the members of RBD. The characters of the sitcom were not based on the band's characters in Rebelde, but intended to be similar to the actors' real personalities. RBD: La Familia was the first Mexican show shot entirely in High Definition. The show ran from March 14, 2007 – June 13, 2007, and only lasted 13 episodes.

In 2007, Herrera began filming Volverte a Ver with Ximena Herrera. It was released in December 2008. The movie was filmed in Mexico and Argentina. In 2008, he also starred in the play The Pillowman, replacing actor Kuno Becker. To date, RBD has made 9 studio albums, including albums in Spanish, Portuguese and English. They have sold over 15 million albums worldwide, and have toured across Mexico, South America, Serbia, Romania, the United States, and Spain.

Poncho wrote the song "Si No Estas Aqui" on the fifth studio album by the Mexican band RBD, Empezar Desde Cero (2007). On August 15, 2008, RBD released a message telling fans that they had decided to split up. They went on one final tour, Gira del Adiós World Tour, which ended in early 2009. In a November 2008 interview with Open magazine, Herrera said he has no intention of having a solo singing career after RBD and that he does not see himself as a singer. Herrera gave voice to the main character in the animated film Igor (2008). From September to December 2008, Poncho starred in the Mexican series Terminales, playing a man who was diagnosed with a terminal illness.

In 2009, he began filming Venezzia in Venezuela, alongside Ruddy Rodríguez. On May 21, 2009, it was announced that Herrera would star alongside Spanish Mexican singer/actress Belinda Peregrín in Televisa's latest novela, Camaleones. Herrera played Sebastián, a man who pretends to be a professor and steals expensive art work in order to protect his jailed father. On August 6, 2009, he also guest-starred in an episode of Mujeres Asesinas, "Soledad, Cautiva", alongside his Rebelde co-star Angelique Boyer.

Poncho was part of the cast of the third season of the series Tiempo Final in the episode "El Billete" in 2009. Herrera also worked alongside actors Plutaco Haza, Paola Núñez, Sergio Klainer, Guillermo Larrea, Jana Raluy, and Raúl Vallejo on the Spanish version of Rain Man, known in Spanish as Cuando los hermanos se encuentran.

Besides Rain Man, 2011 has brought up new projects for Herrera. He worked on a television series called El Equipo produced by Pedro Torres where he played a federal policeman named Fermín Pérez. This series has been compared to the television series CSI and was aired in Mexico as well as the United States. Alfonso is currently filming a television series called El Diez where he will play a soccer player named 'Chava Espinoza'. This series will be aired soon on ESPN Deportes; which is available on the United States as well as some Latin American countries. On August 19, 2011, Así es la Suerte was premiered. He played the revolutionary Aquiles Serdán in the Mexican series El Encanto del Águila (2011).

In 2013, Herrera starred with Paz Vega in the Mexican horror film Espectro. He entered the third season of the Colombian series El Capo (2014) as Niño Malo, for this character, he was nominated for the TVyNovelas Award for best supporting actor in the series and starred in the Mexican film Perfect Obedience. Still in 2014, he was the protagonist of the controversial Mexican film The Perfect Dictatorship.

He also was in the Netflix original series Sense8 (2015–18), where he starred as Hernando Fuentes the boyfriend of Lito Rodriguez, played by Miguel Ángel Silvestre. They are a gay couple who are not open about their relationship due to the fact that Lito is a big Mexican movie star. Once his secret is out Hernando and Lito struggle to persevere through it. In 2015, he starred in the Mexican series El Dandy. In 2016, Herrera gave life to Ramón Mercader in the film The Chosen.

He played Ramón Mercader in the Mexican-Spanish drama The Chosen (2016). Between 2016 and 2017, Herrera participated in two episodes of the Mexican series Drunk History, played Che Guevara and again reprised the role of Aquiles Serdán. Herrera starred Father Tomas in Fox's American horror series The Exorcist (2016–2017). He joined the recurring cast of the third season of the American series Queen of the South (2018) and in the fourth became part of the main cast along with the Brazilian actress Alice Braga. He played Leon in the Mexican series Sitiados: México in 2019.

In 2020, he participated as himself in the episode "Romcom" in the Mexican series How to Survive Being Single by Amazon Prime Video. Also in 2020, Herrera starred in David Pablos's movie Dance of the 41, playing Ignacio de la Torre y Mier, the gay son-in-law of the President of Mexico. For his performance Dance of the 41, he won the Ariel Award for Best Actor.

Personal life 
In 2002, Herrera started dating actress and singer Dulce María; they met during the filming of the soap opera Clase 406, and the relationship ended in 2005.

In 2016, he married journalist Diana Vázquez. They have two sons. The couple divorced in 2021.

Filmography

Film

Television

Podcasts

Discography

Theatre

Awards and nominations

Notes

References

External links

 
 Official Website

1983 births
Best Actor Ariel Award winners
Living people
Mexican male film actors
Mexican male stage actors
Mexican male telenovela actors
Mexican male singers
Mexican capoeira practitioners
Male actors from Mexico City
RBD members
Portuguese-language singers of Mexico
Singers from Mexico City
United Nations High Commissioner for Refugees Goodwill Ambassadors